Barbary Shore is Norman Mailer's second published novel, written after Mailer's great success with his 1948 debut The Naked and the Dead. It concerns a protagonist who rents a room in a Brooklyn boarding house with the intention of writing a novel. Wounded during World War II, he is an amnesiac, and much of his past is a secret to him. After Rinehart & Company published the novel in 1951, it received poor reviews and sold poorly. The failure of Barbary Shore and only moderate success of Mailer's next novel, The Deer Park (1955) triggered a decade-long hiatus from the novel by Mailer, which ended with the publication of An American Dream in 1965.

Reviews

1951 American novels
Rinehart & Company books
Novels by Norman Mailer
Novels set in New York City